"Twenty Flight Rock" is a song originally performed by Eddie Cochran in the 1956 film comedy The Girl Can't Help It, and released as a single the following year. The song was published in 1957 as written by Ned Fairchild and Eddie Cochran, by American Music Incorporated and Campbell, Connelly and Company. Cochran's contribution was primarily on the music. His version is rockabilly-flavored, but artists of a variety of genres have covered the song.

Background
The first version of "Twenty Flight Rock" was recorded by Cochran in July 1956 at Gold Star Studios, with Connie Smith on the bull fiddle and Jerry Capehart thumping a soup carton. Cochran re-recorded the song sometime between May to August 1957. This later version was released in the United States (Liberty 55112) with "Cradle Baby" as a flipside. It was a moderate seller, but was more popular in Europe and had steady sales for a long period. The song is from the point of view of a boyfriend whose girlfriend has an apartment on the twentieth floor; the building elevator is not operating; consequently the boyfriend has to climb the stairs, making him too tired to “rock” by the time he reaches her.

The song follows the twelve-bar blues format, using the device of counting upwards ("One flight, two flight, three flight, four/five, six, seven flight, eight flight, more") in the refrain in a manner similar to "Rock Around the Clock". The final verse ends on a surprisingly morbid note compared to other pop songs of the time: "All this climbin' is a-gettin' me down. They'll find my corpse draped over a rail."

The barely 15-year-old Paul McCartney used "Twenty Flight Rock" as his first song when he auditioned for John Lennon on July 6, 1957 in Liverpool, England. The 16-year-old Lennon, introduced that day to McCartney at St. Peter's Church Hall prior to a church garden fete, was impressed by his new acquaintance's ability to play the song on the guitar. The good first impression of McCartney's performance led to an invitation to join the Quarrymen—Lennon's band that would eventually evolve into the Beatles. On The Beatles Anthology, McCartney noted that: "I think what impressed him most was that I knew all the words."

Cochran appeared in the film The Girl Can't Help It performing "Twenty Flight Rock" as a tongue-in-cheek example of the supposed lack of talent required to perform rock and roll. The guitar solo was edited out in the movie. The song also featured in the film The Delinquents (1989).

Musicians, 1956 version
 Eddie Cochran – guitar, vocals
 Connie "Guybo" Smith – double bass
 Jerry Capehart – box slapping

Musicians, 1957 version
 Eddie Cochran – guitars, vocals
 Perry Botkin Sr. – rhythm guitar
 Connie "Guybo" Smith – double bass
 The Johnny Mann Chorus – backing vocals

Notable cover versions
 Cliff Richard and The Shadows recorded a rendition on Richard's 1959 debut album Cliff Sings.
 Paul McCartney sang the song for John Lennon when they met for the first time in 1957. He would record a studio version on the 1988 album, CHOBA B CCCP, and a live version was included in the 1999 concert film, Live at the Cavern Club.
 Vince Taylor released a version on 1961's Le Rock C'est Ça!.
 Dickie Rock and the Miami Showband released a version on a 7" single in 1964 on Piccadilly Records.
 Commander Cody and His Lost Planet Airmen released a version on their 1971 album Lost in the Ozone.
 Montrose released a version on their 1975 album Warner Bros. Presents Montrose!.
 Robert Gordon and Link Wray recorded a version on the album Fresh Fish Special.
 The Rolling Stones released a version on their 1982 album Still Life. Recorded during the band's American Tour 1981.
 Tiger Army included a version on its 1999 debut album Tiger Army.
 Conan O'Brien performed it as a duet with Jack White at the Nashville date of the former's Legally Prohibited from Being Funny on Television Tour in 2010, which was included on the live album, Conan O’Brien – Live At Third Man. The two would repeat this rendition on the first episode of Conan.

References

External links
 Eddie Cochran at 45cat.com

1957 singles
Eddie Cochran songs
Commander Cody and His Lost Planet Airmen songs
Songs written for films
Songs written by Eddie Cochran
Liberty Records singles